Martin Golightly (1891 – 1953) was an English professional footballer who played as an inside forward.

References

1891 births
1953 deaths
People from Burnopfield
Footballers from County Durham
English footballers
Association football inside forwards
Fatfield Albion F.C. players
Gateshead F.C. players
Exeter City F.C. players
Bideford A.F.C. players
Durham City A.F.C. players
Grimsby Town F.C. players
Charlton's F.C. players
English Football League players